The Battle of Carraleva Pass (Albanian: Beteja e Carralevës) was a battle between Albanian rebels and Ottoman forces during the Revolt of 1910. The clash represented a military offensive launched by Shevket Turgut Pasha against Albanian rebels that were blocking the Carraleva Pass. After 3 Days of fighting the Albanian insurgents were defeated and retreated to the Drenica region.

According to Albanian sources the Ottomans attacked 8,000 Albanian with 20,000 irregular soldiers. Both sides suffered heavy casualties.

Background 
In 1910 the Young Turk Ottoman government imposed new centralization policies in Albania, which resulted in the Albanian revolt of 1910. The Rebels were supported by the Kingdom of Serbia. New taxes levied in the early months of 1910 led to Isa Boletini's activity to convince Albanian leaders who had already been involved in a 1909 uprising to try another revolt against the Ottoman Empire. The Albanian attacks on the Ottomans in Priştine (now Pristina) and Ferizovik (now Ferizaj), the killing of the Ottoman commander in İpek (now Peja), and the insurgents blocking of the railway to Skopje at the Kaçanik Pass led to the Ottoman government's declaration of martial law in the area.

Days before the Battle in the Carraleva Pass, the Albanians were defeated in the Battle of Kaçanik Pass.

Aftermath 
After the Battle, Ottoman forces entered Prizren in the middle of May 1910. They proceeded to Yakova and İpek where they entered on June 1, 1910. By government orders part of the force proceeded in the direction of Scutari (now Shkodër), while another column marched toward the Debre region (now known as Dibër in Albania, and Debar in the Republic of North Macedonia). The first column marching to Scutari managed to capture the Morinë pass, after fighting with the Albanian tribal forces of the Gashi, Krasniqi and Bytyqi areas, led by Zeqir Halili, Abdulla Hoxha, and Shaban Binaku. Ottoman forces were stopped for more than 20 days in the Agri Pass, from the Albanian forces of Shalë, Shoshë, Nikaj and Mërtur areas, led by Prel Tuli, Mehmet Shpendi, and Marash Delia. Unable to repress their resistance, this column took another way to Scutari, passing from the Pukë region. On July 24, 1910, Ottoman forces entered the city of Scutari (now known as Shkodër). During this period martial courts were put in action and summary executions took place. A large number of firearms were collected and many villages and properties were burned by the Ottoman army.

See also 

 Albanian revolt of 1912
 Malësor tribes revolt of 1917

References

Sources 

 
 
 
 
 
 
 
 
 

Military history of Albania
1910 in Albania
1910 in the Ottoman Empire
Carraleva Pass
Albanian Question